Moldgreen is a district of Huddersfield, West Yorkshire in England, approximately one mile (1.5 km) east of the town centre between Dalton and Aspley.

The main Wakefield Road, the A629, is the main thoroughfare through the district.

The area was originally known as "Mold Green" or "Mould Green" and was a hamlet in the Kirkheaton parish and in the Dalton township.

Rugby league

Moldgreen has a successful amateur rugby league team based on Ridgeway, at the edge of Dalton

See also
Listed buildings in Almondbury

References

Areas of Huddersfield